Imandra is a rural locality (a Selo) in Olenegorsk municipality of Murmansk Oblast, Russia. The village is located on the eastern shore of Lake Imandra, at an elevation of 154 m above sea level.

History
The station of Imandra may have been a part of Imandrsky Selsoviet, which possibly existed in 1922–1924 in Kolsko-Loparskaya Volost of Alexandrovsky Uyezd of Arkhangelsk Governorate in the Russian SFSR, although some documents included it as a part of Yekostrovsky Selsoviet.

Transportation
The Imandra station on the St. Petersburg—Murmansk railway is located here.

References

Notes

Sources

Rural localities in Murmansk Oblast